Edmund Huchoun (died c.1395), of New Romney, Kent, was an English Member of Parliament.

Edmund was married with one son, Peter Huchoun.

He was a Member (MP) of the Parliament of England for New Romney in October 1382 and November 1390.

References

14th-century births
1395 deaths
14th-century English people
People from New Romney
Members of the Parliament of England (pre-1707)